Kenneth Richard Greenwood (15 December 1941 – 18 April 2021) was an Australian rules footballer who played for Carlton and Footscray in the Victorian Football League (VFL).

A ruckman, Greenwood was recruited from South Bendigo and was an understudy to John Nicholls during his time at Carlton. In just his eighth league game, Greenwood appeared in the 1962 VFL Grand Final, which Carlton lost. He never established a regular place in the team until 1964 but even then received limited game time due to Nicholls.

Greenwood, after trying to get a clearance to Melbourne, was given to Footscray in order to keep Ian Robertson, who was part of Footscray's recruitment zone, at Carlton. In 1967, his first season, Greenwood was runner up in the 'Best and Fairest' to John Jillard by one vote. His VFL career ended in 1972 when he badly injured his knee and he spent the 1973 season as captain-coach of Preston.

References

External links

Ken Greenwood's playing statistics from The VFA Project
Holmesby, Russell and Main, Jim (2007). The Encyclopedia of AFL Footballers. 7th ed. Melbourne: Bas Publishing.

1941 births
2021 deaths
Carlton Football Club players
Western Bulldogs players
Preston Football Club (VFA) players
Preston Football Club (VFA) coaches
South Bendigo Football Club players
Australian rules footballers from Victoria (Australia)